Arthur Roe (1892–1960) was an English professional footballer who played in the Football League for Luton Town, Bournemouth & Boscombe Athletic and Arsenal as a half back.

Personal life 
Four months into the First World War, Roe enlisted in the Football Battalion of the Middlesex Regiment on 16 December 1914.

Career statistics

References

1892 births
1960 deaths
People from South Normanton
Footballers from Derbyshire
English footballers
English Football League players
Association football midfielders
British Army personnel of World War I
Middlesex Regiment soldiers
Southern Football League players
Luton Town F.C. players
Arsenal F.C. players
AFC Bournemouth players
Mansfield Town F.C. players
Midland Football League players
Date of birth missing
Year of death missing
Place of death missing